The canton of Les Corbières Méditerranée (formerly known as the canton of Sigean) is an administrative division of the Aude department, southern France. Its borders were not modified at the French canton reorganisation which came into effect in March 2015. Its seat is in Sigean.

It consists of the following communes:
 
Caves
Feuilla
Fitou
Leucate
La Palme
Peyriac-de-Mer
Port-la-Nouvelle
Portel-des-Corbières
Roquefort-des-Corbières
Sigean
Treilles

References

Cantons of Aude